Education in the Thirteen Colonies during the 17th and 18th centuries varied considerably. Public school systems existed only in New England.  In the 18th Century, the Puritan emphasis on literacy largely influenced the significantly higher literacy rate (70 percent of men) of the Thirteen Colonies, mainly New England, in comparison to Britain (40 percent of men) and France (29 percent of men)

How much education a child received depended on a person's social and family status. Families did most of the educating, and boys were favored. Educational opportunities were much sparser in the rural South.

The Puritans valued education, both for the sake of religious study (they demanded a great deal of Bible reading) and for the sake of citizens who could participate better in town meetings. A 1647 Massachusetts law mandated that every town of 50 or more families support a 'petty' (elementary) school and every town of 100 or more families support a Latin, or grammar, school where a few boys could learn Latin in preparation for college and the ministry or law.  In practice, virtually all New England towns made an effort to provide some schooling for their children.  Both boys and girls attended the elementary schools, and there they learned to read, write, cipher, and they also learned religion. The first Catholic school for both boys and girls was established by Father Theodore Schneider in 1743 in the town of Goshenhoppen, PA (present day Bally) and is still in operation. In the mid-Atlantic region, private and sectarian schools filled the same niche as the New England common schools.

The South, overwhelmingly rural, had few schools of any sort until the Revolutionary era.  Wealthy children studied with private tutors; middle-class children might learn to read from literate parents or older siblings; many poor and middle-class white children, as well as virtually all black children, went unschooled.  Literacy rates were significantly lower in the South than the north; this remained true until the late nineteenth century.

A unique exception to this state of Southern education is the Ursuline Academy in New Orleans. This institution, founded in 1727 by the Catholic sisters of the Order of Saint Ursula, was both the oldest, continuously-operating school for girls and the oldest Catholic school in the United States. It also holds many American firsts, including the first female pharmacist, first woman to contribute a book of literary merit, first convent, first free school and first retreat center for ladies, and first classes for female African-American slaves, free women of color, and Native Americans.

Secondary schools were rare outside major towns such as Boston, New York City, Philadelphia, and Charleston.  Where they existed, secondary schools generally emphasized Latin grammar, rhetoric, and advanced arithmetic with the goal of preparing boys to enter college.  Some secondary schools also taught practical subjects such as accounting, navigation, surveying, and modern languages. Some families sent their children to live and work with other families (often relatives or close friends) as a capstone to their education.

Higher education
The first colleges, not including pre-collegiate academies, were:

New College in Massachusetts (subsequently Harvard University) (1636)
College of William and Mary in Virginia (1693) 
Collegiate School in Connecticut (subsequently Yale University) (1701)
College of New Jersey (subsequently Princeton University) (1746)
King's College in New York (subsequently Columbia University) (1754)
College of Philadelphia (subsequently the University of Pennsylvania) (1755)
College of Rhode Island (subsequently Brown University) (1764)
Queen's College in New Jersey (subsequently Rutgers University) (1766)
Dartmouth College in New Hampshire (1769)

Only white males were admitted; some took students as young as 14 or 15, and most had some sort of preparatory academy for those who needed Latin or other basic skills.
College faculties were generally very small, typically consisting of the college president (usually a clergyman), perhaps one or two professors, and several tutors, i.e. graduate students who earned their keep by teaching the underclassmen.  All students followed the same course of study, which was of three or (more commonly) four years' duration.  Collegiate studies focused on ancient languages, ancient history, theology, and mathematics.  In the 18th century, science (especially astronomy and physics) and modern history and politics assumed a larger (but still modest) place in the college curriculum.  Until the mid-18th century, the overwhelming majority of American college graduates became Protestant clergymen.  Towards the end of the colonial period, law became another popular career choice for college graduates.

Vocational education
Although few youth of the colonial era had access to secondary or higher education, many benefited from various types of vocational education, especially apprenticeship.  Both boys and girls were apprenticed for varying terms (up to fifteen years in the case of young orphans).  Apprentices were typically taught a trade (if male) or sewing and household management (if female) as well as reading and basic religious knowledge.  Of course, many children learned job skills from their parents or employers without embarking on a formal apprenticeship.

Notes

Further reading
Axtell, James. The school upon a hill: Education and society in colonial New England. Yale University Press. (1974).
Bailyn,  Bernard. Education in the Forming of American Society U of North Carolina Press, 1960
Cremin, Lawrence.  American Education: The Colonial Experience, 1607–1783.  New York: Harper & Row, 1970.
Faragher, John Mack, ed.  The Encyclopedia of Colonial and Revolutionary America.  New York: Da Capo Press, 1996.
Johnson, Clifton.  Old-Time Schools and School-books.  New York: Dover, 1963.
Knight, Edgar Wallace. Public education in the South (1922) online edition
Robson, David W. Educating Republicans: The College in the Era of the American Revolution, 1750–1800. Greenwood, 1985. 272 pp.
Spruill, Julia Cherry.  Women's Life and Work in the Southern Colonies.  Chapel Hill: University of North Carolina Press, 1938.

History of the Thirteen Colonies
Thirteen Colonies